Dennis Marion Schnurr (born June 21, 1948) is an American prelate of the Roman Catholic Church who has served as the archbishop of the Archdiocese of Cincinnati in Ohio since 2009. He served as bishop of the Diocese of Duluth in Minnesota from 2001 to 2009.

Biography

Early life and education
Dennis Schnurr was born on June 21, 1948, in Sheldon, Iowa, to Edward and Eleanor (née Jungers) Schnurr. One of six children, he has two brothers and three sisters. Raised in Hospers, Iowa, he attended Spalding Catholic High School in Granville, Iowa, before entering Loras College in Dubuque, Iowa.  Schnurr graduated from Loras with a Bachelor of Arts in 1970.  He then went to Rome, where he earned a Master of Theology degree in 1974 from the Pontifical Gregorian University.

Ordination and ministry
Schnurr was ordained to the priesthood by Bishop Frank Greteman on July 20, 1974, for the Diocese of Sioux City. After his ordination, Schnurr was assigned as an associate pastor at the Cathedral of the Epiphany Parish and Blessed Sacrament Parish, both in Sioux City, Iowa, for the next three years.

In 1977, Schnurr went to Washington, D.C. to study at the Catholic University of America School of Canon Law, receiving a Doctorate of Canon Law in 1980. After graduation, he returned to Sioux City to become vice-chancellor of the diocese.  In 1981, Schnurr was named chancellor, the diocesan finance officer (1980–1985), a judge on the diocesan tribunal (1980–1985), and secretary of the presbyteral council (1981–1985).

In 1985, Schnurr was assigned to the staff of the Apostolic Nunciature in Washington, D.C. He served as associate general secretary of the United States Conference of Catholic Bishops (USCCB) from 1989 to 1995; during his tenure, he supervised those departments dealing with education, domestic and international social policy, and communications. Schnurr organized the 1993 World Youth Day in Denver, Colorado. He was raised by the Vatican to the rank of prelate of honor in 1993 as well, and elected general secretary of the USCCB in 1994.

Bishop of Duluth
On January 18, 2001, Schnurr was appointed as the eighth bishop of the Diocese of Duluth by Pope John Paul II.  He received his episcopal consecration on April 2, 2001, from Archbishop Harry Flynn, with Archbishop Gabriel Higuera and Bishop Lawrence Soens serving as co-consecrators. Schnurr selected as his episcopal motto: Quaerite faciem Domini, meaning, "Seek the face of the Lord" from Psalms 105:4.

Coadjutor Archbishop and Archbishop of Cincinnati
Schnurr was named coadjutor archbishop of the Archdiocese of Cincinnati by Pope Benedict XVI on October 17, 2008. As coadjutor, Schnurr automatically succeeded Archbishop Pilarczyk when he retired on December 21, 2009. On January 21, 2017, Schnurr expressed his opposition to the refugee ban on people from certain Muslim majority nations that was enacted by the Trump administration.  Schnurr said that refugees had a right to seek a safe place for themselves and their families.

In 2010, Schnurr revoked archdiocese permission for a "Violence Against Women" event at Seton High School in Cincinnati because one of the speakers supported abortion rights for women.  The sponsors disinvited the speaker, but the archdiocese still denied its support for the event.

On November 21, 2018, Schnurr expressed "enormous disappointment" at a Vatican request for the USCCB to delay a vote on a measure tightening procedures for sexual abuses case.  The Vatican said it wanted to consider a global response first. In August 2019, Schnurr removed Auxiliary Bishop Joseph Binzer from his position as the head of priest personnel.  Geoff Drew, a priest in St. Jude Parish, had raped a 10-year-old boy between 1988 and 1991.  After learning about these allegations, Binzer failed to report them to the archbishop or other officials in the archdiocese. Binzer resigned as auxiliary bishop in May 2020.

In May 2020, Schnurr decided not to renew the contract of Jim Zimmerman, a teacher at Archbishop Alter High School in Kettering, Ohio, because he was part of a same-sex marriage.  A teacher at the school for 23 years, Zimmerman was open about his marriage with school officials, other faculty and students.  According to Zimmerman, his principal told him that a community member had alerted Schnurr about the marriage.  Zimmerman's supporters at Alter High School and in Kettering accused Schnurr of homophobia, which he strongly denied.

On July 20, 2021, Schnurr said that he disapproved of a town hall being held by President Joe Biden at Mount Saint Joseph University in Cincinnati, but admitted he had no power to block it. Schnurr did not explain his reasoning.  Schnurr said that he would have never approved this event on archdiocese property.

Viewpoints

Marriage 
In June 2015, Schnurr expressed his unhappiness with the U.S. Supreme Court decision legalizing same-sex marriage in the United States.  He made this statement:Under the false banner of "marriage equality," the United State Supreme Court today redefined marriage by judicial fiat. In so doing, it has disregarded not only the clearly expressed will of the electorate in Ohio and other states, but also an understanding of marriage that was shared by virtually all cultures – secular as well as religious – until recently.In February 2015, Schnurr condemned the 2015 film Fifty Shades of Grey, calling it an attack on marriage, and asked people to boycott it.

See also

 Catholic Church hierarchy
 Catholic Church in the United States
 Historical list of the Catholic bishops of the United States
 List of Catholic bishops of the United States
 Lists of patriarchs, archbishops, and bishops

References

External links 
 Roman Catholic Archdiocese of Cincinnati
 Roman Catholic Diocese of Duluth
 Roman Catholic Diocese of Sioux City

1948 births
Living people
21st-century Roman Catholic archbishops in the United States
Roman Catholic archbishops of Cincinnati
Bishops appointed by Pope John Paul II
Bishops appointed by Pope Benedict XVI
Loras College alumni
People from Sheldon, Iowa
Pontifical Gregorian University alumni
Roman Catholic bishops of Duluth
Roman Catholic Diocese of Sioux City
Catholic University of America alumni
Religious leaders from Iowa
Catholics from Iowa
Catholic University of America School of Canon Law alumni
American Roman Catholic bishops by contiguous area of the United States